The Apostolic Vicariate of King George Sounde – The Sound was a short-lived (1845–47) Latin Rite Roman Catholic missionary pre-diocesan jurisdiction in Australia.

It was established in 1845 as an apostolic vicariate (directly subject to the Holy See and not part of any ecclesiastical province) entitled to a titular bishop as ordinary of King George Sounde – The Sound on territories split off from the then Roman Catholic Diocese of Adelaide and the Metropolitan Roman Catholic Archdiocese of Sydney.

No ordinary is recorded. It was suppressed in 1847 and its territory returned.

References

External links 
 GigaCatholic 
 CatholicHierarchy 

Apostolic vicariates
Former Roman Catholic dioceses in Oceania
1845 establishments
Religious organizations established in 1845
1847 disestablishments